L.O. Simenstad Municipal Airport  is a village owned public use airport located southeast of the central business district of Osceola, a village in Polk County, Wisconsin, United States. It is included in the Federal Aviation Administration (FAA) National Plan of Integrated Airport Systems for 2021–2025, in which it is categorized as a local general aviation facility.

Facilities and aircraft 
L.O. Simenstad Municipal Airport covers an area of 389 acres (157 ha) at an elevation of 906 feet (276 m) above mean sea level. It has two runways: 10/28 is 5,006 by 75 feet (1,526 x 23 m) with an asphalt surface, and approved GPS approaches, and 4/22 is 2,192 by 150 feet (668 x 46 m) with a turf surface.

For the 12-month period ending July 22, 2020, the airport had 19,850 aircraft operations, an average of 54 per day: 93% general aviation, 4% air taxi and 3% military. In January 2023, there were 64 aircraft based at this airport: 54 single-engine, 2 multi-engine, 7 glider and 1 ultra-light.  The Red Wing Soaring Association is an active glider club based at Simenstad.

See also 
 List of airports in Wisconsin

References

External links 
 Osceola AeroSport, the fixed-base operator (FBO)
  at Wisconsin DOT Airport Directory
 

Airports in Wisconsin
Transportation in Polk County, Wisconsin